Ronald Lowrie (born 5 March 1955) is a retired professional Scottish footballer and manager. He made over 240 appearances as a goalkeeper in the Scottish League for Alloa Athletic between 1984 and 1991 and also played league football for Queen's Park, Clydebank, Hamilton Academical and Partick Thistle. He was capped by Scotland at amateur and junior level. He had a five-year career in management in junior football with Pollok, his final club as a player.

Personal life 
As of May 2007, Lowrie was physical education teacher at Barrhead High School.

Honours 
Alloa Athletic
 Scottish League Second Division second place promotion: 1988–89
Pollok
 Scottish Junior Cup: 1996–97

References 

Scottish footballers
Scottish Football League players
Queen's Park F.C. players
Association football goalkeepers
Scotland amateur international footballers
1955 births
Footballers from Aberdeen
Clydebank F.C. (1965) players
St Roch's F.C. players
Hamilton Academical F.C. players
Stranraer F.C. players
Blantyre Victoria F.C. players
Baillieston Juniors F.C. players
Alloa Athletic F.C. players
Partick Thistle F.C. players
Pollok F.C. players
Scotland junior international footballers
Living people
Scottish football managers
Pollok F.C. managers
Scottish Junior Football Association players
Scottish Junior Football Association managers